The Minister for Courts or Minister of Courts is a minister in the government of New Zealand. The minister has responsibility for the support and administration of the courts system. It was split from the Justice portfolio in 1995.

List of Ministers
Key

References

Courts
Public office-holders in New Zealand
Courts